Pray is a comune (municipality) in the Province of Biella in the Italian region Piedmont, located about  northeast of Turin and about  northeast of Biella.

Pray borders the following municipalities: Caprile, Coggiola, Crevacuore, Curino, Portula, Trivero.

Demographic evolution

References

Cities and towns in Piedmont